Jastreb ( in Serbo-Croatian) may refer to:

 Jastreb, Montenegro, a village near Danilovgrad
 Jastreb Vuk-T, a Yugoslav glider aircraft
 Mile Dedaković, a Croatian Army officer known by the nom de guerre "Jastreb"
 Soko J-21 Jastreb, a Yugoslav light attack aircraft
 , a Royal Yugoslav Navy ship

See also